Jaijaidin ( Jaejaedin) is a Bengali-language daily published from Dhaka, Bangladesh.

Editor
In Bangladesh, Jaijaidin was published and edited by Shafik Rehman, but he lost the editorship of Jaijaidin in 2008 for his stand against a military-backed government. Kazi Rukanuddin Ahmed is now the acting editor. Sayeed Hossain Chowdhury is now the Chairman of the Board of Editors. It used to be published as a weekly until mid-2006, at which point it became a daily. It came into fame during the 1980s because of its modern outlook and  strong stance against the military ruler Hossain Mohammad Ershad. At one point it was banned by Ershad. It started republication after democracy was restored in 1991.

Location

It is located in the "HRC Media Bhaban" in the Tejgaon Industrial Area. The complex has two buildings.

The South Building has three floors. The ground floor houses the printing section, the commercial department, circulation department and the Reception desk. The first floor is open for visitors. The Clinton room is the round table room. It was opened formally by the US ambassador to Bangladesh Patricia Butenis. The Mahathir Room is the place to organize workshops. The Monroe Studio is used for staged photo shoot for the newspaper and for recording television programs. The Hitchcock Hall is a 40-seat movie theatre. then comes the Picasso Gallery and the Che Cafe. It is the place for the popular entertainment article "10 minutes at the Che Café". The second floor is the work place for journalists. The News, Editorial, Feature, IT and Photography departments are housed here. The Floor has 176 desks for Journalists.

The North Building has two floors. The printing paper storage is on the ground floor. The power generation facility is on this floor as well. The first floor has a 44-bed Dormitory. This dorm facility is for the students from the remote places of the country invited by the newspaper for a short visit to Dhaka to have a practical idea of the internal structure of a daily newspaper. The paper offers free short courses for the students as well. This floor also has the Mao Canteen.

Other information
Shafik Rehman's Jaijaidin has introduced in Bangladesh celebration of Love Day (ভালবাসা দিবস) Bhalobasha Dibôsh (Valentine's Day) on 14 February. Jaijaidin first introduced special issues with the articles from mass readers. Special magazines are written by mass people, and these magazines helped create thousands of freelance writers in Bangladesh. The publication is the writing place for most non-resident Bangladeshi's. Beside introducing Valentine's Day this was the first Bangladeshi news publication to have its own website. As a weekly the Jaijaidin first implemented the idea of Reader's Poll to elect the most popular performing artists.

See also
 List of newspapers in Bangladesh

Notes

External links
 Jaijaidin homepage

Bengali-language newspapers published in Bangladesh
Daily newspapers published in Bangladesh
Newspapers published in Dhaka